The Roviana rail (Hypotaenidia rovianae) is a species of bird in the family Rallidae. It is endemic to the Western Province (Solomon Islands).

Its natural habitats are subtropical or tropical moist lowland forest, subtropical or tropical moist shrubland, and plantations .

References

Roviana rail
Birds of the Western Province (Solomon Islands)
Endemic fauna of the Solomon Islands
Roviana rail
Taxonomy articles created by Polbot
Endemic birds of the Solomon Islands